Serena Williams defeated the defending champion, her sister Venus Williams, in the final, 6–2, 7–6(7–4) to win the singles title at the 2009 WTA Tour Championships. It was her second Tour Finals singles title. With the win, Serena Williams claimed the year-end world No. 1 ranking for the second time.

Players

Alternates

Draw

Finals

White group
Standings are determined by: 1. number of wins; 2. number of matches; 3. in two-players-ties, head-to-head records; 4. in three-players-ties, percentage of sets won, or of games won; 5. steering-committee decision.

Maroon group
Standings are determined by: 1. number of wins; 2. number of matches; 3. in two-players-ties, head-to-head records; 4. in three-players-ties, percentage of sets won, or of games won; 5. steering-committee decision.

See also
WTA Tour Championships appearances

External links
 Draw

WTA Tour Championships
Singles 2009